Läderach is a Swiss chocolate and confectionary manufacturer based in Ennenda (Glarus). It was founded in 1962 in Glarus by Rudolf Läderach (1929–2013). His patent for the process of manufacturing hollow, ready-made chocolate truffles revolutionized the fine chocolate industry. In 2004 Läderach decided to enter the consumer market by acquiring Merkur Confiserie AG, a well-established chocolate retailer. In 2012 the company was further vertically integrated towards end-consumers when it opened  its first factory in Bilten in the Alps region. As of 2020 Läderach operates 100 stores in 35 countries.

History

Foundation 
In 1970 Rudolf Läderach invented and patented his "process to manufacture thin-walled hollow balls for truffles", which simplified and improved the production of truffles. In 1994, he handed over the operational  management of the company to his second son Jürg Läderach, who is now the vice president of the board of directors.

Under the leadership of Jürg Läderach, the chocolate maker acquired Olten-based Merkur Confiserie AG, a well-established chocolate and coffee retailer in 2004 to sell its products directly to consumers; having been a supplier to caterers and other chocolate manufacturers for over half a century. Läderach rebranded all Merkur locations.

In 2015, 750 employees worked for Läderach. By 2021, the number grew to 1,000 and reached 1,300 by 2022.

International expansion 
In 1981 Läderach opened its first foreign subsidiary, Confiseur Läderach GmbH & Co KG. The first international consumer branches opened in 2019: two branches in Toronto (Canada) and one branch in New York (United States). Läderach plans to open up to 35 stores in the United States. As of 2020, Läderach operates 100 stores across five continents.

In 2020, Läderach opened a visitor center and museum at the Bilten factory, called the "House of Läderach". The company announced in February 2021 that it was opening 30 outlets in the United States, having taken over sites and retail space from Godiva Chocolatier.

Criticism 
Jürg Läderach and his son Johannes have been involved in the Christianity for Today  association for many years, which has been heavily criticized for its radical views (rejection of same-sex partnerships, opponents of abortion). Further, management staff of Läderach company are high-ranking members of the CFT association. In addition, Jürg and Johannes Läderach are co-organizers of the "March for Life", a political demonstration against the right to abortion. Jürg Läderach has also been fighting against homosexuals and pornography for years. Swiss and German LGBT groups call for a boycott of the Läderach Products. Swiss International Air Lines ended their collaboration with Läderach in November 2019. Johannes Läderach publicly distanced himself from homophobic statements, stating that he would never want to hurt or discriminate against people because of their sexual orientation.

See also 
 Swiss chocolate
 List of bean-to-bar chocolate manufacturers

References

External links
Official website
Visitor center

Swiss chocolate companies
Swiss brands
Chocolate bean-to-bar
Brand name chocolate
Food and drink companies established in 1962
Canton of Glarus
Tourist attractions in the canton of Glarus
Swiss companies established in 1962